Alexander Karlovich Beggrov (Alexander Beggrow) was a Russian landscape and marine art painter of Baltic German origin, notable for his seascapes and Saint Petersburg cityscapes.

Biography
Alexander Beggrov was a son of Karl Beggrov (Beggrow), a German painter who spent all his career in Russia. He decided to become a naval officer, and in 1863, he went into the navy. In particular, in 1871-1872 he participated in the round-the-world journey. Still as a naval officer, in 1868 he started his art studies under the supervision of Alexey Bogolyubov. In 1873, Bogolyubov moved to France, and Beggrov, who wanted to continue his art studies, enrolled in the Royal Academy of Arts, where he studied under Mikhail Konstantinovich Clodt for a year. In 1874, he retired from the navy and moved to Paris, where he mainly continued to work under the guidance of Bogolyubov. He also got to know Russian artists working in France, including Ilya Repin.

In 1875, Beggrov returned to Saint Petersburg, and in 1878, he joined the Society for Travelling Art Exhibitions. In 1879, he travelled by sea to Greece, and from there to France, where he stayed for two years. Subsequently, Alexander Beggrov moved back to Russia and settled in Gatchina. In 1903, his wife died. Last years of his life, Beggrov was terminally ill. In August 1914, he committed suicide.

Selected paintings

References

1841 births
1914 deaths
Painters from Saint Petersburg
People from Sankt-Peterburgsky Uyezd
Russian people of German descent
Peredvizhniki
19th-century painters from the Russian Empire
Russian male painters
20th-century Russian painters
19th-century male artists from the Russian Empire
1914 suicides
Suicides by firearm in Russia
Imperial Russian Navy officers
20th-century Russian male artists